Reden Marimon Celda is a Filipino professional basketball player for the NLEX Road Warriors of the Philippine Basketball Association (PBA). He played college basketball at the National University. He was drafted by the NLEX Road Warriors at the 2014 PBA draft.

Professional career
Celda was drafted eight overall by the NLEX Road Warriors in the 2016 PBA draft. Nine days after the draft, on November 8, he, along with Rob Reyes and Jeckster Apinan, was traded to the Mahindra Floodbuster for Bradwyn Guinto and Chito Jaime. He became a free agent after the 2021 season.

In October 2022, Celda signed a one-conference contract with the NLEX Road Warriors, the team that originally drafted him. Prior to him signing with NLEX, Celda played with the Zamboanga Family's Brand Sardines of the Maharlika Pilipinas Basketball League (MPBL).

PBA career statistics

As of the end of 2022–23 season

Season-by-season averages

|-
| align=left | 
| align=left | Mahindra / Kia
| 33 || 19.7 || .444 || .333 || .784 || 2.2 || 1.3 || 1.0 || .1 || 9.4
|-
| align=left | 
| align=left | Kia / Columbian
| 30 || 18.2 || .393 || .286 || .800 || 1.4 || 2.3 || .8 || .1 || 7.1
|-
| align=left | 
| align=left | Columbian
| 28 || 15.8 || .333 || .284 || .674 || 2.0 || 2.0 || .8 || .1 || 5.2
|-
| align=left | 
| align=left | Terrafirma
| 10 || 12.6 || .360 || .292 || .700 || 2.0 || .4 || .3 || .0 || 5.7
|-
| align=left | 
| align=left | Terrafirma
| 12 || 12.7 || .327 || .286 || .850 || 1.8 || 1.8 || .5 || .1 || 4.8
|-
| align=left | 
| align=left | NLEX
| 7 || 10.5 || .227 || .077 || 1.000 || .9 || 1.3 || .1 || .0 || 1.7
|- class="sortbottom"
| style="text-align:center;" colspan="2"|Career
| 120 || 16.6 || .387 || .200 || .762 || 1.8 || 1.7 || .7 || .1 || 6.6

References

1992 births
Living people
Basketball players from Davao City
Filipino men's basketball players
Maharlika Pilipinas Basketball League players
NLEX Road Warriors draft picks
NLEX Road Warriors players
NU Bulldogs basketball players
Point guards
Shooting guards
Terrafirma Dyip players